Sydney Simeon Scott (20 December 1913 – 22 April 1985) was an English professional golfer. He is best known for being runner-up in the 1954 Open Championship and for being a member of the British 1955 Ryder Cup team. He won the PGA Seniors Championship in 1964.

He played in the 1938 Daily Mail Tournament at Northumberland Golf Club, making the cut. His first Open Championship was in 1939 where he finished tied for 11th in the qualifying competition. Scoring 76 and 77 he missed the cut by three strokes. In late 1939, he finished second in the northern qualifying competition for the News of the World Match Play, which was subsequently cancelled.

Before World War II, he was the professional at Hartlepool Golf Club and then after the war at Carlisle Golf Club. In 1958 he moved to the Roehampton Club where he was professional until 1980 when he was succeeded by his son Alan.

Professional wins
1950 Leeds Cup
1952 Leeds Cup
1953 Leeds Cup, Dunbar Open Tournament
1954 Dunbar Open Tournament
1955 Leeds Cup
1964 PGA Seniors Championship

Results in major championships

Note: Scott only played in the Masters Tournament and The Open Championship.

NT = No tournament
CUT = missed the half-way cut
"T" indicates a tie for a place

Team appearances
Ryder Cup (representing Great Britain): 1955
Joy Cup (representing the British Isles): 1954 (winners), 1955 (winners), 1956 (winners)
Slazenger Trophy (representing Great Britain and Ireland): 1956 (winners)
Amateurs–Professionals Match (representing the Professionals): 1956 (winners), 1960 (winners)

References

English male golfers
Ryder Cup competitors for Europe
Sportspeople from Cumbria
People from Brampton, Carlisle
1913 births
1985 deaths